Home is a 2008 American drama film written and directed by Mary Haverstick and starring Marcia Gay Harden, Marian Seldes, Michael Gaston and Eulala Scheel.

Cast
Marcia Gay Harden
Marian Seldes
Michael Gaston
Eulala Scheel
Pamela Henning

Release
The film premiered at the Montreal World Film Festival on August 23, 2008.

References

External links
 

American drama films
2008 drama films
2008 films
2000s English-language films
2000s American films